Sir Alan Jack Glyn  (26 September 1918 – 5 May 1998) was a Conservative Party Member of Parliament.  He was educated at Westminster School and Gonville and Caius College, Cambridge, where he read medicine. He proceeded to St. Bartholomew's Hospital Medical School, qualifying as a medical practitioner. He served in the army until 1967.

He married, in 1962, Lady Rosula Windsor Clive, daughter of the 2nd Earl of Plymouth. The couple had two daughters.

He represented Clapham from 1959 to 1964, Windsor from 1970 to 1974, and Windsor and Maidenhead from 1974, to his retirement in 1992, where he was succeeded by Michael Trend.

References

External links 
Times Guide to the House of Commons, 1987 and 1992 editions, 

1918 births
1998 deaths
Alumni of Gonville and Caius College, Cambridge
People educated at Westminster School, London
Conservative Party (UK) MPs for English constituencies
Knights Bachelor
UK MPs 1959–1964
UK MPs 1970–1974
UK MPs 1974
UK MPs 1974–1979
UK MPs 1979–1983
UK MPs 1983–1987
UK MPs 1987–1992
Royal Horse Guards officers
23rd Hussars officers
Military personnel from London
British Yeomanry officers
British Army personnel of World War II
Politicians awarded knighthoods